William Gardiner (14 July 1864 – 27 January 1924) was a New Zealand cricketer. He played first-class cricket for Auckland and Wellington between 1882 and 1896.

In the 1892–93 season Gardiner was regarded as the best batsman in Auckland and "one of the best in the colony", as well as a reliable fieldsman. His highest first-class score was 61, the only fifty in the match, when Auckland beat Canterbury in 1891–92. He top-scored for Wellington with 59 in the drawn match against Hawke's Bay in 1895–96, his last first-class match.

Gardiner also played rugby for Auckland in the 1880s until a shoulder injury curtailed his career. He worked as a builder and contractor, his company being noted for building bridges and wharfs. He and his wife Catherine had one son, Norman. Gardiner died in Wellington aged 59 after a severe illness.

See also
 List of Auckland representative cricketers

References

External links
 

1864 births
1924 deaths
New Zealand cricketers
Auckland cricketers
Wellington cricketers
Auckland rugby union players
Cricketers from Auckland